Darkness and Light is a 1999 Taiwanese drama film directed by Chang Tso-chi. It was screened in the Directors' Fortnight section of the 52nd Cannes Film Festival, and won the Grand Prix at the 12th Tokyo International Film Festival.

Cast
Lee Kang-i 	 ... 	Kang-yi
Wing Fan	 ... 	Ah Ping
Tsai Ming-shiou	 ... 	Kang-yi's father
Hsieh Bau-huei	 ... 	Kang-yi's mother
He Huang-ji	 ... 	Ah Ji

Accolades

References

External links
 

1999 films
1999 drama films
Taiwanese drama films
Taiwanese-language films
1990s Mandarin-language films